Target of Myb protein 1 is a protein that in humans is encoded by the TOM1 gene.

The specific function of this gene has not yet been determined, yet it may involve the translocation of growth factor receptor complexes to the lysosome for degradation.  This gene is localized to 22q13.1, with HMOX1 and MCM5 distally and HMG2L1 proximally positioned.

Interactions
TOM1 has been shown to interact with TOLLIP and ZFYVE16.

References

Further reading

External links